The 2016–17 season was Al-Fayha's third consecutive season in the First Division and their 63rd year in existence. This season Al-Fayha participated in the First Division, King Cup and Crown Prince Cup.

Al-Fayha were promoted to the Professional League for the first time in their history beating fellow promotion chasers Ohod 2–1 on 29 April 2017.

The season covered the period from 1 July 2016 to 30 June 2017.

First-team squad

Out on loan

Transfers

In

Loans in

Out

Loans out

Competitions

Pre-season friendlies

First Division

League table

Results by matchday

Results summary

Matches

King Cup

Crown Prince Cup

Statistics

Appearances

Last updated on 5 May 2017.

|-
! colspan=14 style=background:#dcdcdc; text-align:center|Goalkeepers

|-
! colspan=14 style=background:#dcdcdc; text-align:center|Defenders

|-
! colspan=14 style=background:#dcdcdc; text-align:center|Midfielders

|-
! colspan=14 style=background:#dcdcdc; text-align:center|Forwards

|-
! colspan=14 style=background:#dcdcdc; text-align:center| Player who made an appearance this season but have left the club

|-
|}

Goalscorers

Last Updated: 5 May 2017

Clean sheets

Last Updated: 5 May 2017

References

Al-Fayha FC seasons
Fayha